Itapeuasaurus (meaning "Itapeua lizard") is a genus of rebbachisaurid sauropod dinosaur from the Alcântara Formation (Itapecuru Group) of Maranhão in Brazil. The type and only species is Itapeuasaurus cajapioensis.

Discovery and naming
In November 2014, fisherman Carlos Wagner Silva discovered a fossilised humerus on the beach at Itapeua. Because the location where the holotype was found is an intertidal area, excavating the holotype was very hard and could only be excavated around four hours a day during each daily tidal cycle. In 2019, the species Itapeuasaurus cajapioensis was named and described.

Phylogeny
Lindoso et al., (2019) placed Itapeuasaurus in the Nigersaurinae, as the sister taxon to Demandasaurus.

References 

Rebbachisaurids
Cenomanian life
Late Cretaceous dinosaurs of South America
Cretaceous Brazil
Fossil taxa described in 2019